Successive Slidings of Pleasure is a 1974 French art film directed by Alain Robbe-Grillet.

Plot
The film delves into the surreal and demented psyche of a young woman following the murder of her partner Nora. She is incarcerated in a convent prison where her sexual and sadistic desires interrupt her sense of reality.

Cast
 Anicée Alvina - The Prisoner
 Olga Georges-Picot - Nora
 Michael Lonsdale - The Judge
 Jean Martin - The Priest
 Marianne Eggerickx - Claudia
 Claude Marcault - Soeur Julia
 Maxence Mailfort - Client / Customer
 Nathalie Zeiger - Sister Maria
 Bob Wade - Fossoyeur / Gravedigger
 Jean-Louis Trintignant - The police Lieutenant
 Isabelle Huppert - Bit
 Hubert Niogret - Le photographe
 Alain Robbe-Grillet - Un passant
 Catherine Robbe-Grillet - Une soeur

Production
Luc Béraud is the assistant director on the film.

Release
Successive Slidings of Pleasure was released in France in 1974 where it was distributed by Lira Films.

See also
 Isabelle Huppert on screen and stage

References

External links

1974 films
French erotic drama films
French mystery drama films
French crime drama films
French psychological drama films
1970s French-language films
Films directed by Alain Robbe-Grillet
1970s French films